Attila is an American metalcore band from Atlanta, Georgia, formed in 2005. They have released eight full-length albums.

Though their original formation was in 2005, the band did not start touring full-time until around 2010. Their most successful album, About That Life, was produced by Joey Sturgis, released on June 25, 2013, and debuted on the Billboard 200 chart at number 22. Attila has toured across the United States with bands such as Hed PE, Arsonists Get All the Girls, See You Next Tuesday, Insane Clown Posse, Emmure, Chelsea Grin, The Agonist,  Oceano, Falling in Reverse, and Metro Station.

History

Formation, early releases and Rage (2005–2011)
Chris "Fronz" Fronzak, Sean Heenan, Sam Halcomb, Matt Booth and Kris Wilson formed Attila in their hometown of Atlanta in 2005, meeting each other at their high school and through mutual friends. Frontman Fronzak named the band in reference to Attila the Hun, which he came across in a book. Soon after forming, the band became the fourth imprint on the Artery Foundation/Razor & Tie joint venture, Artery Recordings.

Attila self-released their demo album Fallacy (and not with Statik Factory, contrary to popular belief) on March 30, 2007 and then released their debut album, Soundtrack to a Party in 2008 with Statik Factory, prior signing to Artery Recordings. In their early years Attila toured with Arsonists Get All The Girls, See You Next Tuesday, Chelsea Grin, American Me, and We Are The End. Attila toured with HED PE and Threat Signal from March 3 to April 10.

Attila signed to Artery Recordings in 2010 and released their second album and major label debut, called Rage, on May 11, 2010. The band recorded, produced, mixed, and mastered Rage with Interlace Audio's Stephan Hawkes in Portland, Oregon. Attila released their music video for the album's title track "Rage" on October 8, 2010. On May 13, 2010 the band was announced as support for Drop Dead, Gorgeous' headlining tour, "The Pyknic pArtery Tour", along with From First to Last, Sleeping With Sirens, Abandon All Ships, Woe, Is Me, For All Those Sleeping and Scarlett O'Hara, beginning on July 17 in Texas and ending in Los Angeles on August 20.

On August 19, 2010, the band was announced as support for Stick to Your Guns' North American tour with fellow supporting acts As Blood Runs Black, For the Fallen Dreams and Close Your Eyes beginning on October 1 in Arizona and ending on the 31st in California.

On September 28, 2010, the band was announced as support for Oceano's "Contagion Across the Nation Tour" with fellow supporting acts Chelsea Grin, In the Midst of Lions and Monsters beginning on November 5 in Michigan and ending on the 27th in Illinois.

On May 6, 2011, the band was announced as part of the 2011 "All Stars Tour" along with Emmure, Alesana, Iwrestledabearonce, blessthefall, For Today, In This Moment, Born of Osiris, The Ghost Inside, After the Burial, For All Those Sleeping, Memphis May Fire, Motionless in White, Chelsea Grin and Sleeping With Sirens.

Outlawed (2011–2012)
On July 14, 2011, the band announced that their next album, Outlawed, was set for an August 16 release through Artery Recordings and Razor & Tie. On July 25, 2011 the band revealed the track listing for Outlawed and released the first single from the album, "Payback", for streaming. On August 4, the band released the second single "Smokeout", followed by a music video for "Smokeout" on August 17.

On August 8, 2011, the band was announced as part of the lineup for Alesana and Dance Gavin Dance's "Rock Yourself to Sleep" headlining tour with fellow supporting acts A Skylit Drive, I Set My Friends on Fire and A Loss for Words. On August 31, 2011 the band was announced as support for the "Monster Energy Outbreak Tour 2012" being headlined by Asking Alexandria, and including fellow supporting acts As I Lay Dying, Suicide Silence and Memphis May Fire.

On September 18, 2011, the band was announced as support for We Came As Romans' "Take a Picture, It Will Last Longer" tour beginning on November 22 and finishing on December 9, with fellow supporting acts Falling in Reverse, Sleeping With Sirens and For All I Am.

On October 17, 2011, Attila released their first music video from the album, "Payback". Attila released a lyric video for their song "Another Round" on July 9, 2012, and another lyric video for their song "Nasty Mouth" on October 2, 2012. On October 30, 2012, Attila released a new single, "Party with the Devil", and a re-recorded version of the song "Soda in the Water Cup" from the album Soundtrack to a Party.

On December 12, 2011, the band was announced as part of the lineup for the New England Metal and Hardcore fest 2012 taking place on April 20–22 at the Palladium in Worcester, Massachusetts. On December 22, 2011 the band was announced as part of Chelsea Grin's six-week tour, the "Sick Tour", along with fellow supporting acts For the Fallen Dreams, Chunk! No, Captain Chunk!, Vanna, Volumes and The Crimson Armada.

On March 24, 2012, the band's vocalist, Fronzak, was denied entry for the second time into Canada because of a felony on his record. Fronzak released a statement concerning the incident, saying he could apply for reconsideration in two years.

On June 6, 2012, the band announced that bassist, Chris Comrie had parted ways with the band. The band released a statement, describing the departure as a personal choice made by Comrie and that they were still on good terms. On September 8, 2012 the band announced that they acquired former For the Fallen Dreams' guitarist Kalan Blehm as their new bassist.

On September 13, 2012, the band announced their "Party With the Devil" headlining tour with supporting acts Make Me Famous, Issues, Ice Nine Kills, and Adestria, beginning on October 26 in Florida and ending on November 15 in Washington.

About That Life and side projects (2013–2014)
On January 4, 2013, Attila was announced to play at the Warped Tour 2013 from June 16 to July 11, 2013.

On February 3, 2013, it was announced that the band had finished writing their follow-up to Outlawed and had entered the studio. The band stated that the album would be the "heaviest" and "craziest" album they had ever made. On February 25, 2013, the band uploaded their own "Harlem Shake" video.

On April 20, 2013, Attila released the first single from the album, "Middle Fingers Up", and revealed that the new album, titled About That Life, would be released on June 25, 2013. On May 24, 2013, Attila teamed up with Spotify and Revolver and released the title track from the record, "About That Life".

On August 1, 2013, the band announced the "About That Life" headlining tour with supporting acts Upon a Burning Body, The Plot in You and Fit for a King. On December 11, 2013, it was announced that frontman, Chris Fronzak would be heading into the studio the next month to begin recording his forthcoming hip hop album. Later that night on Fuse's Warped Roadies it was announced that Attila would be playing Warped Tour 2014, with fellow announcements Tear Out the Heart, Mayday Parade, the Protomen and Plague Vendor.

On December 13, 2013, the band announced "The New King's Tour" with supporting acts I See Stars, Capture the Crown, Ice Nine Kills, Myka, Relocate, and ARTISANS, beginning on January 31, 2014. On December 18, 2013 the band was announced as support for A Day to Remember's "Self Help Festival" on March 22, 2014 in San Bernardino, California.

On July 22, 2014, the band introduced Machine Gun Kelly at the APMAs where he performed the song "See My Tears" with the Cleveland Contemporary Youth Orchestra.

On August 18, 2014, the band was announced to headline the Monster Outbreak Tour 2014 with supporting acts Crown the Empire, Like Moths to Flames and Sworn In. The tour was scheduled to kick off on November 14 in Fort Lauderdale and end on December 14 in Massachusetts. On September 5, they were announced as support for Black Veil Brides' UK tour with fellow supporting act Fearless Vampire Killers, beginning on October 3 in Cardiff, UK and ending on October 17 in Leeds, UK.

In 2016, Attila was scheduled to join Hollywood Undead on their Europe tour.

Guilty Pleasure and the departure of Nate Salameh (2014–2016)
On October 6, 2014, the band unveiled their new album, Guilty Pleasure, which was to be released on November 24. Fronzak described the album as the heaviest they had written. On October 20, 2014 the band released the first single from the album, "Proving Grounds".

On October 22, Alternative Press reported that guitarist Nate Salameh had left the band. When asked about the decision, Salameh said that he wanted to focus on living a drug and alcohol-free life.

On November 8, 2014, the band released the album second single, "Horsepig", with Fronzak stating that it was "one of my favorite songs I've ever written lyrically." The band played a 26-date tour in support of the album, "The Guilty Pleasure Tour", which kicked off in Lauderdale, Florida on November 11 and ended on December 14 in Boston, Massachusetts.

Attila played the entirety of the 2015 Vans Warped Tour on the main stage.

Burying the proverbial hatchet with Falling in Reverse frontman Ronnie Radke, Fronzak and the rest of Attila announced a co-headlining tour with Falling in Reverse called the Supervillains Tour with support from Metro Station and Assuming We Survive. The tour was played at the tail end of 2015.

Attila did a European tour with Hollywood Undead, starting in March 2016.

Signing to SharpTone Records and Chaos, Villain (2016–2021)
On June 24, 2016, Attila announced that they had signed to SharpTone Records, a new label co-founded by Nuclear Blast CEO Markus Staiger and Shawn Keith. "We are REALLY excited to announce that we have officially signed to SharpTone!" shared Attila frontman Fronzak. "We are at an amazing point in our career and we know that these guys have the power that we need to take things to the next level."

Chaos was released on November 4, 2016.

On January 1, 2017, Sean Heenan announced that he was leaving the band. The band later issued a statement of their own regarding his departure, citing that the reasons revolved around feeling like it was "time to make a change to improve our rhythm section."

On March 22, 2017, it was revealed Attila would be playing the 2017 Vans Warped Tour. On October 31, 2017, Attila released their single "Three 6" onto YouTube.

On February 13, 2018, Attila announced that they are an unsigned band after their year run with SharpTone Records.

On July 7, 2018, a new web-single "Pizza" was released. The music video for the single was uploaded to the band's YouTube channel on July 12.

On February 22, 2019, Attila released an album titled Villain.

On May 29, 2020, Attila released a new song titled "Cancelled". and the next month drummer Bryan McClure was fired from the band following several rape and sexual misconduct allegations.

Closure (2021–present)

On March 18, 2021, Attila released a new song titled "Clarity" as the lead single from their upcoming ninth studio album Closure.

On April 30th, 2021, Attila released a new song titled "Metalcore Manson"  as the album's 2nd single.

The album was released on July 23, 2021.

Musical style
Attila's musical style has been described as metalcore, deathcore, nu metalcore, rap metal, and nu metal.

Members

Current members
 Chris "Fronz" Fronzak – lead vocals (2005–present)
 Chris Linck – lead guitar (2008–present), backing vocals (2016–present), rhythm guitar (2014–2021)
 Kalan "Kal" Blehm – bass, backing vocals (2012–present)
 Walter Adams – rhythm guitar (2021–present)
 Tyler Kruckmeyer – drums (2021–present)

Former members
 Sean Heenan – drums (2005–2017)
 Matt Booth – lead guitar (2005–2008)
 Kris Wilson – rhythm guitar (2005–2007)
 Sam Halcomb – bass (2005–2008)
 Nader "Nate" Salameh – rhythm guitar (2008–2014)
 Paul Ollinger – bass (2008–2010)
 Chris Comrie – bass, backing vocals (2010–2012)
 Bryan McClure – drums (2017–2020)

 
Timeline

Side projects

Kalan Blehm
On September 15, 2014, Blehm announced his instrumental side project, Frozen Forest, and released "Blue Eyes", the third song following the releases of "Dreamer" and "Work".

Chris Linck 
On December 15, 2020, it has been announced a project called Emerald Royce that involves Chris Linck and former Issues and Woe, Is Me frontman, Tyler Carter.

Discography
Studio albums
Fallacy (2007)
Soundtrack to a Party (2008)
Rage (2010)
Outlawed (2011)
About That Life (2013)
Guilty Pleasure (2014)
Chaos (2016)
Villain (2019)
Closure (2021)

Singles

 Party With The Devil (2012)
 Three 6 (2017)
 Callout 2 (2018)
 Blackout (2018)
 Still About It (2018)
 Pizza (2018)
 Cancelled (2020)
 Clarity (2021)
 Metalcore Manson (2021)
 Day Drinking (2021)
 Handshakes With Snakes (2023)

References

External links
Official label website

2005 establishments in Georgia (U.S. state)
American deathcore musical groups
Metalcore musical groups from Georgia (U.S. state)
Heavy metal musical groups from Georgia (U.S. state)
Musical groups from Atlanta
Musical groups established in 2005
Musical quintets